Altinho is a municipality/city in the state of Pernambuco in Brazil. The population in 2020, according with IBGE was 22,984 inhabitants and the total area is 452.52 km2.

Geography

 State - Pernambuco
 Region - Agreste of Pernambuco
 Boundaries - Caruaru and São Caetano   (N);  Cupira, Panelas and Ibirajuba   (S);  Agrestina    (E);   Cachoeirinha   (W).
 Area - 452.52 km2
 Elevation - 454 m
 Hydrography - Una and Ipojuca rivers
 Vegetation - Caatinga hiperxerófila
 Clima  -  semi arid hot
 Annual average temperature - 23.1 c
 Distance to Recife - 163 km

Economy

The main economic activities in Altinho are related with commerce and agribusiness, especially creations of cattle, sheep, goats, pigs and chickens.

Economic Indicators

Economy by Sector
2006

Health Indicators

References

Municipalities in Pernambuco